Septet in E-flat major may refer to:
 Septet (Beethoven)
 Septet (Saint-Saëns)